National Park Route 615 is a route through the Delaware Water Gap National Recreation Area. The route consists of two parts, County Route 615, maintained by Sussex County, New Jersey, and the remainder of the route, maintained by the National Park Service.

County Route 615 is a short county highway in Sussex County, New Jersey.

Official maps from both the New Jersey Department of Transportation and Sussex County list the termini of the route at the above points, but some maps suggest the route is much longer, extending as far as County Route 560 in the north, and as far as the Warren County line on Old Mine Road in the south.

The section is known as National Park Service Route 615.

Route description

National Park Service Route 615 

National Park Service Route 615 begins at the Warren and Sussex County line south of Flatbrookville, New Jersey. Route 615 heads northward through the Delaware Water Gap National Recreation Area along the alignment of the Old Mine Road until the intersection with Flatbrook-Stillwater Road, where the highway heads to the north. The route soon enters the small community of Flatbrookville, New Jersey (now maintained by the National Park Service), winding through woodlands as a two-lane asphalt highway. A short distance later, Route 615 cross the Flat Brook and turn to the northeast along Walpack Road, paralleling the Flat Brook for several miles. Eventually, the Flat Brook recedes to the southeast, and the highway makes a curve to the northeast through the rural farmlands for several miles. Soon the Flat Brook does return along Route 615 and intersecting with Haneys Mill Road, a dirt road, where the highway turns further northeast along Walpack. The highway continues down the Flat Brook Valley, passing a local RV park before heading northbound through woodlands, where it curves to the north. 

At the intersection with Pompey Road, Route 615 turns along Sandyston-Flatbrookville Road, passing the Walpack Inn and another RV park before entering the community of Walpack Center. In Walpack Center, Route 615 passes the nearby Ranger Station and enters the small community, passing the post office at the intersection with Main Street. After leaving Walpack Center, the highway continues northward through fields and sparse housing for several miles. Soon, the ROW of Fish & Game Road merges in with Route 615, where the route turns to the northeast and east. At the intersection with Bridge Road, National Park Service Route 615 turns to the north and heads through forestry before passing nearby houses. At that point, National Park Service Route 615 enters the community of Peters Valley (formerly Bevans), where the maintenance of Route 615 turns over to Sussex County at Kuhn Road.

Sussex County Route 615 

At the intersection with Kuhn Road and Walpack Road North, Route 615 changes to the northeast along Kuhn Road as Sussex County Route 615. The highway continue northeastward through Peters Valley, a small art-based community before heading northward through the local police archery and reaching the site of a trail, where Route 615 turns to the east. The highway turns eastward along Kuhn Road until the intersection with County Route 640 (Bevans Road), where Route 615 officially ends.

However, until 2009, signage continued along Ennis Road, a two concrete lane, closed off portion of Route 615 through the ruralmost parts of Sandyston Township. The alignment continued to the southeast, crossing through farmland until entering forestry, where it bended several times until reaching a concrete parking lot. A short distance later, the roadway ended in shrubbery and at a guard rail due to the lack of bridge over a stream. On the other side of the stream, the former alignment of County Route 615 (Ennis Road) continues to the northeast, passing through forestry and fields, where there are several dirt roads. The route continued northward until entering fields near a county maintenance department before intersecting with the County Route 560 (Tuttles Corner Road).

History 
Route 615 follows the alignment of the Columbia and Walpack Turnpike through most of its alignment. The original turnpike was chartered in 1819 by the New Jersey State Legislature to run from the community of Columbia to Walpack Center by a vote of 43–2. The Columbia and Walpack Turnpike was originally constructed in 1832, which helped locals develop the communities of Millbrook and Flatbrookville. However, both communities dwindled by 1910, and as of 2009, both communities are used as little tourist attractions. Although the local communities dropped, the Columbia and Walpack Turnpike remained, and due to problems with waterbeds, was realigned during the 1950s. However, this also eliminated the crossroads at the heart of Millbrook and the nearby automobile traffic had already used the Old Mine Road to bypass Millbrook. The former alignment of the Columbia and Walpack is now just a dirt pedestrian path.

Major intersections

See also

References

External links

Roads in Sussex County, New Jersey
National Park Service areas in New Jersey